Missouri's 33rd Senatorial District is one of 34 districts in the Missouri Senate. The district is based in South Central Missouri in the Ozark Plateau and includes all of the counties of Camden, Howell, Laclede, Oregon, Shannon, Texas, and Wright.

The district has been represented by Republican Karla Eslinger.

District profile
Major cities in the district include Lebanon, West Plains, Mountain Grove, Mountain View, Osage Beach, Willow Springs, Cabool, Licking, and Houston. The district is home to the Lake of the Ozarks.

This predominantly rural South Central Missouri district is heavily white and solidly Republican. While Democrats hold a few offices at the local/county level, the GOP dominates all levels of government in the district.

Demographics
According to the 2010 U.S. Census:
Population: 184,118
White/Caucasian: 95.95%
Hispanic/Latino: 1.83%
Two or More Races: 1.64%
Black/African American: 0.85%
Native American: 0.66%
Some Other Race: 0.48%
Asian: 0.39%
Pacific Islander: 0.03%

Voting in statewide elections

Election results

1996

2000

2004

2008

Missouri General Assembly
Missouri State Senate districts